Shervin Mirhashemi (born July 13, 1969) is an American sports executive, specializing in business solutions for teams and venues. Mirhashemi is the CEO of Legends Hospitality, a premium experiences company founded by Dallas Cowboys owner Jerry Jones and the owners of the New York Yankees.

In January 2021, Legends announced a majority investment from Sixth Street, a global investment firm with over $50 billion in assets under management, that valued Legends at $1.3 billion USD.

Early life
Mirhashemi was born on July 13, 1969. He graduated from Miraleste High School in Palos Verdes, CA and earned a J.D. from the University of Southern California and a B.A. in Biomedical Engineering from University of California San Diego.

Career
Mirhashemi joined Legends as President and COO in 2013  after more than two decades as a leading executive in the sports and entertainment space. He was named CEO in 2016, and sits on the Legends Hospitality Board of Directors.

Under Mirhashemi, Legends has grown its service offerings and established four new divisions: Global Merchandise, Global Partnerships, Global Technology Solutions and Growth Enterprises. Legends also expanded internationally, representing Real Madrid, FC Barcelona, Manchester City F.C., Rugby World Cup 2023, UFC, The European Tour and Ryder Cup, among others.

Legends client roster includes: global professional sports leagues including the NFL,  MLB,  PFL, UFC,  NASCAR and FIFA; teams and venues such as the Dallas Cowboys, New York Yankees, SoFi Stadium (Los Angeles Rams/Los Angeles Chargers), Buffalo Bills, Real Madrid, FC Barcelona, Detroit Pistons and Los Angeles Angels; Colleges and universities such as the University of Southern California, University of Notre Dame, Northwestern University, University of Miami and San Diego State University; and live event attractions such as One World Observatory atop One World Trade Center in New York City.

Boards and Affiliations
Mirhashemi is a Board Member for Legends for Charity benefitting St. Jude Children’s Research Hospital.

Personal life
He resides in Southern California with his wife, Alex, and their two children.

References

1969 births
American chief executives
American sports businesspeople
Entertainment industry businesspeople
Living people